The 2005 Copa Libertadores was the 46th edition of the Copa Libertadores. The champion also qualified for the 2005 FIFA Club World Championship.

It was the first time ever that two teams from the same country reached the final. This year's tournament was also the first Copa Libertadores to employ the away goals rule in knockout ties. São Paulo won the tournament, becoming the first Brazilian team to win the cup on three occasions.

Preliminary round
12 teams from 11 football associations dispute 6 places in the Group Stage.

Team #1 was home in the first leg.

Group stage
The six winners from the preliminary round join the other twenty-six teams in the group stage. The top 2 teams in each group advanced to the knockout stage.

Tiebreakers, if necessary, are applied in the following order:
Cumulative goal difference.
Total goals scored.
Away goals scored.
Sorting

Group 1

Group 2

Group 3

Group 4

Group 5

Group 6

Group 7

Group 8

Knockout round

Qualified teams
The teams seeded 1 to 8 (first placed teams of each group) and 9 to 16 (second placed teams of each group) and the ties were 1 vs 16, 2 vs 15, etc.

Bracket

Round of 16

First leg matches were played between May 17, 2005, and May 19, 2005. Second leg matches were played between May 24, 2005, and May 26, 2005.

Quarterfinals

First leg matches were played on June 1, 2005, and June 2, 2005. Second leg matches were played between June 14, 2005, and June 16, 2005.

Semifinals

First leg matches were played on June 22, 2005, and June 23, 2005. Second leg matches were played on June 29, 2005, and June 30, 2005.

Finals

First leg match was played on July 6, 2005. Second leg match was played on July 14, 2005.

Top goalscorers
9 goals
Santiago Salcedo 
6 goals
Robinho 
Ricardinho 
Lima 
Omar Bravo 
Martín Palermo 
Daniel Bilos 
Martín Arzuaga 
Ernesto Farías
5 goals
Rogério Ceni 
Luizão 
Deivid 
Rodrigão 
Francisco Palencia 
Andrés Guglielminpietro

References

External links
 Group Phase Results

1
Copa Libertadores seasons